Majes-Siguas is an irrigation project in Peru which envisages transferring water from the Colca River to the Siguas River for irrigation purposes, and further to take water from the Apurimac River.

The project 

The Angostura Reservoir is part of Majes-Siguas II.

Effects 

The Majes-Siguas project allowed the irrigation of  land, which were settled by about 2693 colonists, and the development of about 5700 households. Also, the second stage foresees the development of about  hydropower, with hydropower plants being constructed along the aqueduct that transfers water from the Colca to the Siguas. 

The irrigated area has been planted with artichokes, avocado, cantaloupe, chili pepper, cochineal, garlic, grapes, kiwicha, onion, paprika, peas, quinoa and tomatoes; also there is a dairy industry at Majes-Siguas.

Water leaks and destabilization of the clayey soils by waters from sprinkler irrigation have caused landslides, sometimes approaching the Pan-American Highway, and concerns have been raised that the expansion of the Majes-Siguas project through Majes-Siguas II will aggravate the situation.

History 

In 1971, the construction of the Majes-Siguas project was declared necessary by the decree No.18375 in order to develop Southern Peru and in the next year another decree classified it as a regional development project.

In 1982, the statutory corporation AUTODEMA was created in order to administer the project. In 2018, concerns were raised about corruption in AUTODEMA including fabricated expenses, resulting in an investigation by the Comptroller General of Peru.

Between 2006 and 2010, the second stage of Majes-Siguas (Majes-Siguas II) was planned, including the development of an environmental impact statement for the Angostura Dam. An investment of - was projected for Majes-Siguas II. In 2014-2015, laws were enacted authorizing the acquisition of land for the construction of Majes-Siguas II, which was also declared a "project of public need". In 2014,  were projected as investment in Majes-Siguas II, which is considered to be payable with the revenue from hydropower and the newly cultivated land. The project is being carried out through a public-private partnership involving the state and the "Angostura-Siguas Consortium". The work on the Apurimac-Colca diversion project began in 2017, with a ceremony in the presence of the then Peruvian president Pedro Pablo Kuczynski.

Political considerations 

Generally, though, the execution of Majes-Siguas II has been stalled by the review process and by bureaucratic issues. In November 2018, a commission of the Congress of Peru started investigating events surrounding Majes-Siguas II, including the delay but especially the decision by the Governor of Arequipa Region to modify the construction contract which raised the price of the project and the exact nature of this modification, which involved using pipelines instead of canals at a price exceeding . This change known as "Addendum 13" had been proposed after the project had met resistance by the people of Espinar Province which were afraid that the Angostura Dam would impact their own agricultural development. The technological change was aimed at reducing the water needs of Majes-Siguas II by reducing evaporation, but raised criticism by lawmakers about the extra cost to the state. The project has also engendered protests, first in the Cuzco Region then in the Caylloma Province, the last one involving strikes and demands for better conditions in places where the Majes-Siguas project is being built.

References

Sources 

 

Water in Peru
Irrigation in Peru